Bayley is an English surname. Notable people with the surname include:

 Arthur Wellesley Bayley (1865–1896), Australian gold prospector
 Barrington J. Bayley (1937–2008), English science fiction writer
 Blaze Bayley (born 1963), English singer, lyricist, and songwriter
 Elizabeth Ann Seton, born Elizabeth Ann Bayley
 Hugh Bayley (born 1952), British Labour Party politician
 Ian Bayley, British computer scientist and quiz player
 James Roosevelt Bayley (1814–1877), American prelate of the Catholic Church
 John Bayley (disambiguation), various people
 Matheson Bayley (born 1978), British pianist, composer, orchestrator, singer and television host
 Peter Bayley (disambiguation), several people
 Robert Bayley (–1859), English independent minister
 Ryan Bayley (born 1982), Australian professional track cyclist and double Olympic gold medallist
 Stephen Bayley (born 1951), British design critic, cultural critic, journalist and author
 Warner B. Bayley (1845–1928), United States Navy rear admiral
 Will Bayley (born 1988), British Paralympic table tennis player
 William Bayley (1879–1955), Canadian politician
 William Butterworth Bayley (1782–1860), British Governor-General of India

See also
 Bayley (wrestler) (born 1989), ring name of professional wrestler Pamela Martinez
 Bayley (disambiguation)
 Bailey (surname)
 Bayly (surname)

English-language surnames